Let's Hope It's a Girl is a 1986 Italian comedy film directed by Mario Monicelli. For this film Monicelli was awarded with a David di Donatello for Best Director and a Nastro d'Argento in the same category. The film also won the David di Donatello for Best Film, Best Supporting Actress, Best Supporting Actor, Best Producer, Best Editing and Best Script.

Plot 
Elena Leonardi lives apart from her husband, with her younger daughter, a niece, a housemaid also with a daughter of same age, and a senile uncle of the husband, in a rural farm house in the countryside. Her husband returns to propose a big renovation project to build a modern SPA, but he does not manage to find her support due to the severe economic situation of the farm, and a previous history of failed business ideas and debts. 
He dies in a car accident, partially caused by exasperation for not being taken seriously in the family, neither in business nor in the education of the daughters, one of which he has just found in bed with yet another fiance just brought home the day before. The grieving family decides to sell off the whole property, pay off the debts, and split: some would move to Rome, the senile uncle would be tricked to stay in a hospice, the older daughter would get married, the housemaid would finally follow her husband who had emigrated in Australia many years earlier.
The plan eventually falls apart. In the end the family reunites in the farm, decides not to sell it off - although not knowing how to pay for its up-keeping and the debts. They decide to continue living together in the countryside.

Cast 
 Liv Ullmann: Elena 
 Catherine Deneuve: Claudia 
 Philippe Noiret: Count Leonardo 
 Giuliana De Sio: Franca 
 Stefania Sandrelli: Lori Samuelli 
 Bernard Blier: Uncle Gugo
 Giuliano Gemma: Guido Nardoni 
 Athina Cenci: Fosca 
 Paolo Hendel: Mario Giovannini 
 Lucrezia Lante della Rovere: Malvina 
 Adalberto Maria Merli: Cesare Molteni 
 Nuccia Fumo: Rosa Nardoni 
 Paul Muller: Priest
 Carlo Monni: Autista

References

External links

1986 films
Commedia all'italiana
Films directed by Mario Monicelli
Italian comedy films
Films set in Tuscany
Films set in Rome
Films shot in Lazio
Films about families
Films with screenplays by Suso Cecchi d'Amico
1986 comedy films
Films scored by Nicola Piovani
1980s Italian-language films
1980s Italian films